Louis Dupree may refer to:

Louis Dupree (professor) (1925–1989), anthropologist and expert on Afghanistan
L. G. Dupre (Louis George Dupree, 1932–2001), American football player

See also
 Louis Dupré (disambiguation)